Four Oaks Commercial Historic District is a national historic district located at Four Oaks, Johnston County, North Carolina.  It encompasses 29 contributing buildings and 1 contributing structure in the town of Four Oaks.  It includes notable examples of Mission Revival style architecture and buildings dating from about 1890 to 1957. It includes commercial, residential, ecclesiastical, and educational structures. Notable buildings include the W.E. Stanley Store (c. 1890, 1947), Blake Adams Store (1904), Four Oaks Bank Building, Lassiter Building (c. 1925), W. D. Allen Building (1926), Four Oaks Drugstore (1937), Sinclair Gas Station (c. 1930s).

It was listed on the National Register of Historic Places in 2006.

References

Commercial buildings on the National Register of Historic Places in North Carolina
Historic districts on the National Register of Historic Places in North Carolina
Mission Revival architecture in North Carolina
Buildings and structures in Johnston County, North Carolina
National Register of Historic Places in Johnston County, North Carolina